Paul Field is a British Christian musician and songwriter who has been active since the mid-1970s first with Nutshell and then later as a solo artist. He has continued to write music and his works have won several awards.

Background 

He began his career in the early 1970s with the folk trio called Jesus Revolution. The group, including Heather Bennett and Pam Thiele, renamed itself as Nutshell and recorded two albums. They have been called an English version of 2nd Chapter of Acts. Bennett and Thiele then left and were replaced by Annie McCaig and Mo McCafferty and released two further albums. After the release of Believe it or Not, in 1979, the band changed its name to Network 3 and released two singles, both produced by Cliff Richard. Between 1979 and 1981 they toured as backing singers and support act with Cliff Richard.

Network 3 disbanded and Field embarked on a solo career releasing Restless Heart in 1982. He has written six musicals, Daybreak, Visions, Breaking Bread, Burning Questions, Hopes and Dreams and Here and Now. Field continued to combine his solo career with production, songwriting and arranging. He has also written music for film, television and advertising (including British Rail, the Cabbage Patch Kids, Astro Farm, Guinness, Australian TV and the Tokyo Motor Show).

Field's song "Testify to Love", co-written with Ralph van Manen and Henk Pool, reached No. 1 on the Christian Songs for Avalon. It was later recorded by Wynonna Judd for the double-platinum soundtrack album for the TV show, Touched by an Angel which made No. 3 in the Billboard Chart. More recently the song was re-released as the title track on Avalon's Greatest Hits album. Field's songs have been recorded by Cliff Richard. These include "Thief in the Night", "This Love", "All That Matters" and the controversial "The Millennium Prayer". In the US, Field's songs have been recorded by artists including Rebecca St James, Jaci Velasquez, Phil Keaggy, Point of Grace, Natalie Grant and Jennifer Knapp and he regularly works in Nashville on various projects.

In 2001 and 2002 he travelled to India with Garth Hewitt. They co-wrote and produced an album for Christian Aid in support of the Dalit people. The Dalit Drum uses live recordings of Dalit drummers.

In 2004, one of Field's children's songs, "Surrounded by His Love", was used as part of the Queen Elizabeth's Christmas message, on Christmas Day.

Field has been written and providing production for Jonathan Veira. He has written songs for a Dutch film and completed two albums of children's songs. He has also provided backing vocals for Brian Houston, written lyrics for a BBC project for
school assemblies. Produced Beyond Belief with Martin John Nicholls, for Christian Aid. He has also worked on Cargo, a project seeking the abolition of the slave trade. This has been developed alongside Anti-Slavery International, Compassion, Stop the Traffik and the UK Human Trafficking centre. Throughout 2007, Cargo has been toured with Coco Mbassi, Mike Haughton, Sadie Chamberlain and Dan Wheeler.

Field has won an Ivor Novello Award from the British Academy of Songwriters, Composers and Authors and a Dove Award from GMA in Nashville. He has also been nominated for Dove Awards on two other occasions. Many artists around the world have recorded his songs and his production and arrangement credits range from country to gospel to classical and back to rock and pop.

Discography
Nutshell
 In Your Eyes (1976, Myrrh, MYR1029)
 Flyaway (1977, Myrrh, MYR1056)
 Begin Again (1978, Myrrh, MYR1067)
 Believe it or Not (1979, Myrrh, MYR1084)
 Best of Nutshell (1981, Myrrh, MYR1099)

Network 3
 Last Train Home (1980, EMI, single, 5120)
 "Dangerous Game" (1981, EMI, single, 5205)

Solo
 Restless Heart (1982, Myrrh, MYR1117)
 Daybreak [Musical] (1983, Dayspring, DAY4008)
 Building Bridges (1984, Myrrh, MYR1168)
 Visions [Musical] (1985, Myrrh, MYX1191)
 Different Yet the Same with Roy Martin (1986, Myrrh. MYRR1211)
 Breaking Bread [Musical] (1986, Kingsway)
 Love Between the Lines (1988, Edge, ER7011)
 Tattoo (1989, Independent)
 For the World One Voice (1991, Go For Music)
 State of the Heart' (1992, ICC)
 Pass it On (1992, ICC)
 Burning Questions [Musical] (1993, Kingsway)
 Big Dreams and Little Rebellions (1994, ICC)
 Fit for Life (1995, ICC)
 Empty Page (1997, ICC, ICCD21430)
 Hopes and Dreams (1998, Kingsway)
 Time Will Tell [Musiacal] (1999, Independent)
 Dangerous Journey [Musical] (2000, ICC)
 In the Long Run (2000, ICC, ICCD51630)
 Here and Now [Musical] (2002, Kingsway, KMCD2423)
 Make a Joyful Noise (2003, ICC)
 Let There be Peace (2003, ICC, ICCD77130)
 Still You Speak (2004, ICC)
 Without the Song and Dance (2005, Nearfield)
 CARGO [Musical] (2007, Nearfield)

Design with Paul Field
 Invisible Fire (1988, Krea Holland)

Garth Hewitt and Paul Field
 The Dalit Drum (2001, Christian Aid)

References

Literature
Mark Allan Powell. Encyclopedia of Contemporary Christian Music'. (Peabody, Massachusetts: Hendrickson, 2002)
Ken Scott. Archivist: Vintage Vinyl Jesus Music, 1965–1980. 3rd edition. (Ken Scott, 2003)

External links

Cross Rhythms profile

Year of birth missing (living people)
Living people
English rock singers
Ivor Novello Award winners
British performers of Christian music